Cloughbawn GAA is a Gaelic Athletic Association club based in the Clonroche, County Wexford, Ireland. The club is primarily concerned with the game of hurling. The club is most famous for its "three in a row" in 2016, making it to the senior hurling final, junior hurling final and intermediate A football, losing out in all three. Cloughbawn are renowned for their ability to reach county finals and get beaten, having been beaten in the 2021 and 2022 intermediate football final. Best wishes in their endeavours for the elusive three in a row in 2023.

Overview

History
In the Autumn of 1917 a number of young hurlers got together after a mummers ball in Forrestalstown and  decided that there should be a club formed and entered a team in the 1918 championship; this club was to be known as Cloughbawn. While they already had a club in existence in the top end of the parish known as Killegney, it did not cater for the whole of the parish.

Honours

Wexford Senior Club Hurling Championships: 3
 1949, 1951, 1993
 Wexford Intermediate Hurling Championships: 1
 1973
 Wexford Junior Hurling Championship: 4
 1935, 1946, 1972, 1980
 Wexford Minor Hurling Championship: 1
 1979 (with Adamstown)
 Wexford Minor Football Championship: 2
 1976 (with Adamstown), 1979 (with Adamstown)

Notable players

 Noel Carton
 Tim Flood
 Harry Kehoe
 Larry Murphy

External links
Cloughbawn GAA club website

Gaelic games clubs in County Wexford
Hurling clubs in County Wexford